Thegiornalisti was an Italian indie pop band formed in 2009.

They debuted in 2011 with the album Vol. 1, but they reached mainstream audience with the third album Fuoricampo, released in 2014.

On 21 June 2017, the band released the single "Riccione", which became a summer hit and peaked number 1 on Italy's Singles and Albums Charts, ranked by FIMI. Their fifth album Love reached the top of the weekly chart of the best-selling albums in September 2018.

In 2019, frontman Tommaso Paradiso left the band in order to start a solo career.

Discography

Albums

Extended plays 
 Canzoni fuori (2012)

Singles

References 

Musical groups established in 2009
Musical groups disestablished in 2019
Musical groups from Rome
Italian pop music groups
Indie pop groups